Holmes Township was a civil township in Mackinac County in the U.S. state of Michigan.  Organized on April 12, 1827, Holmes included parts of Michigan's upper and lower peninsulas within the original county of Michilimackinac.  The county and township both became smaller over time, until 1895 when Holmes consisted of only Mackinac Island and Round Island.  Holmes was incorporated into the City of Mackinac Island effective March 20, 1900.

1827 Bounds
Holmes Township was created with the following legal description:

Commencing at the intersection of the Cheboigun river, with the parallel of north latitude 44 degrees 30 minutes, and running west along said parallel, until it strikes Lake Michigan, thence due north until it intersects the parallel of north latitude 46 degrees, thence east along said parallel until it would intersect a line due north from the place of beginning.

Interpreting this description today is problematic because there is no apparent intersection between the headwaters of the Cheboygan River and the line of 44.5 degrees north latitude.  This leaves the eastern bound indeterminate.

1842 Name Change
Holmes Township was renamed to Mackinac Township on February 16, 1842.

The name change was reversed back to Holmes Township on March 9, 1843.  This was enacted the same day as the division of the Upper Peninsula.  The county of Michilimackinac was notably confined to the Upper Peninsula at that time.

1873 Map
By 1873, Holmes Township was reduced to the portion of Mackinac County east of St. Ignace.

1894 Bounds
By 1894, Holmes Township was about the size of a survey township in the Upper Peninsula, with Bois Blanc Island, Mackinac Island, Round Island, and St. Martins Island.

References

Defunct townships in Michigan
Populated places in Mackinac County, Michigan
1827 establishments in Michigan Territory
1900 disestablishments in the United States
Populated places established in 1827
Populated places disestablished in 1900